Dirk Radszat (born 4 June 1971) is a German judoka.

Achievements

References

1971 births
Living people
German male judoka
20th-century German people